Mutants is a collection of science fiction stories by Gordon R. Dickson.  It was first published by Macmillan in 1970.  The stories originally appeared in the magazines Astounding, Analog Science Fiction and Fact, Galaxy Science Fiction and Fantasy and Science Fiction.

Contents

 Introduction"
 "Warrior"
 "Of the People"
 "Danger—Human!"
 "Rehabilitated"
 "Listen"
 "Roofs of Silver"
 "By New Hearth Fires"
 "Idiot Solvant"
 "The Immortal"
 "Miss Prinks"
 "Home from the Shore"

References

1970 short story collections
Short story collections by Gordon R. Dickson